Meredith Smith (born July 28, 1942) was the head men's basketball coach at the University of Maryland Eastern Shore from 2007 to 2008.  He replaced Larry Lessett in 2007.

Smith is an alumnus of UMES, having graduated in 1964.

References

1942 births
Living people
American men's basketball coaches
High school basketball coaches in the United States
Maryland Eastern Shore Hawks men's basketball coaches
University of Maryland Eastern Shore alumni